Vladimír Hurt (born 8 May 1948) is a Czech former sports shooter. He competed at the 1972, 1976 and the 1980 Summer Olympics.

References

External links
 

1948 births
Living people
Czech male sport shooters
Olympic shooters of Czechoslovakia
Shooters at the 1972 Summer Olympics
Shooters at the 1976 Summer Olympics
Shooters at the 1980 Summer Olympics
People from Přerov District
Sportspeople from the Olomouc Region